Donald Hall (1928-2018) was an American poet, writer, editor, and literary critic.

Donald Hall may also refer to:

 Donald Hall (actor) (1867–1948), British-American film actor
 Donald Hall (RAF officer) (1930–1999), British Royal Air Force officer 
 Donald A. Hall (1898–1968), aeronautical engineer and aircraft designer
 Donald J. Hall Jr. (born 1956), president and chief executive officer of Hallmark Cards
 Donald J. Hall Sr. (born 1928), chairman and majority shareholder of the American company Hallmark Cards
 Donald Hall, part of the superhero team Hawk and Dove from DC Comics